Devi Pora, commonly known as Devipora, is a village in the Anantnag tehsil of Anantnag district in the Kashmir Valley of Jammu and Kashmir, India. It is situated 17 km away from the town of Achabal.

Demographics
According to the 2011 Census of India, Devi Pora village has a total population of 1,509 people including 851 males and 658 females; and has a literacy rate of 53.74%.

References 

Geography of Jammu and Kashmir